Neil David Gibson (born 10 October 1979) is a Welsh manager and former footballer who is currently manager of Connah's Quay Nomads.

Management career
He was manager of  Prestatyn Town from the 2007–2008 season until March 2011 when Lee Jones became first team manager and Gibson became Director of Football.  He returned to the post of first team manager the following season, leading the club until January 2018 when he resigned.

After a short spell as a coach with Connah's Quay Nomads, he returned to Prestatyn Town as manager in October 2018. After leading the club to the Cymru North championship title in the 2019–20 season he left the club in October 2020, unhappy with the direction of the club under the new owner Jamie Welsh.

In December 2020 he was appointed manager of Flint Town United.  He departed from the club in June 2022.

In August 2022, he returned back to Connah's Quay Nomads as the club's first team manager prior to the start of the 2022-23 Cymru Premier season.

References

External links

Neil Gibson at TranmereRovers.co.uk

1979 births
Living people
Sportspeople from St Asaph
Welsh footballers
Association football midfielders
Tranmere Rovers F.C. players
Rhyl F.C. players
Sheffield Wednesday F.C. players
Southport F.C. players
Halesowen Town F.C. players
Leigh Genesis F.C. players
Prestatyn Town F.C. players
English Football League players
Cymru Premier players
National League (English football) players
Southern Football League players
Wales under-21 international footballers
Cymru Premier managers
Welsh football managers
Flint Town United F.C. managers
Prestatyn Town F.C. managers